James Curran Barry (March 7, 1870  – April 4, 1943) was an American boxer who held the world bantamweight championship from 1894 to 1899. Commonly referred to as "The Little Tiger", Barry retired undefeated with a record of 59–0–10.  He was inducted into The Ring magazine Hall of Fame in 2000.

Career
He was born in Goose Island on the North Side of Chicago, Illinois, on March 7, 1870, to Garrett and Mary Barry. He learned to box in rough schoolboy bouts, but trained for the profession in earnest by 13 when he began taking lessons at McGurn's Handball Courts in Chicago. He soon came under the tutelage of former featherweight title claimant Harry Gilmore who was impressed with his two handed power and knowledge of fundamentals. An exceptional trainer, Gilmore also had future bantamweight champion Harry Forbes as a disciple during this period. When Barry's father died in 1885, Gilmore started him on his amateur career at 15. Not long after his win, Barry came under the management of Charles "Parson" Davies, who was hoping to mold his protege into the new bantamweight champion. Barry turned professional with Davies' assistance by 1890, and fought extensively in that year and the next, though many of his bouts were exhibitions.

World bantam champion, 100-102 lb.
In his most significant early bout, Barry knocked out the 20-year old London boxer Jack Levy in 17 rounds to win the  World Championship on December 5, 1893, in Roby, Indiana, though the win may not have yet been fully sanctioned by the United States.

Showing his championship form, on February 6, 1894, the blond Chicagoan faced future Irish bantamweight champion Joe McGrath at Chicago's Empire Theatre, knocking him down in less than a minute into the first round. Starting with a straight left, and a short right hook to the jaw, he put McGrath down hard in the first round.  After rising unsteadily, McGrath was knocked down twice more by Barry, before time was called for the first round, with McGrath barely being able to walk to his corner.  The second was tame, but near the end of the third Barry again went at McGrath, forcing him to clinch before the round ended, and a technical knockout was called when the police intervened.

Several boxing historians consider Barry's first ascent to the USA Bantamweight World championship for the  class to have come after his defeat of Jimmy Gorman on June 2, 1894, at the Olympic Club New Orleans, Louisiana.  After five rounds, it was evident that Barry would win the contest and take the $1,000 prize on route to a convincing 11th-round knockout before a large crowd. The win was made more significant as it was sanctioned both as a United States and World championship.

Bantamweight 105 lb title 
The following year, he cemented his claim to the world bantamweight crown (the weight limit at the time ranged from ) when former bantamweight champion George Dixon moved up to the featherweight class. The bantamweight division in America at the time was sometimes referred to as "paperweight" and was not officially established.  Barry's best-known fight became his 28th-round knockout of Sicilian boxer Casper Leon before a seasoned crowd of 250 on September 15, 1894, in Lemont, Illinois, for total stakes of $4,000.  Leon would become Barry's greatest rival and his most frequent opponent.  In the 20th round, Barry, though he had received punishment to his eyes in previous rounds, landed a strong blow to Leon's jaw, and the direction of the fight shifted.  From the 21st through 28th rounds, Barry knocked Leon down repeatedly, until the 28th when a final blow to Leon's jaw caused the knockout. Barry, though he took home $800, was severely punished in the lengthy contest.  According to one source, as the weigh-in was early, the men may have fought at several pounds above the weight limit.

Barry faced Casper Leon a second time on March 30, 1895, for both the USA and World 105 lb championship, and retained the title with a 14-round draw. The Chicago Tribune wrote that Barry was leading the match, when in the 14th round, after connecting with a series of blows, he landed a left which put Leon on the mat, causing four police officers to end the fight before Leon could be counted out or knocked down again.

Barry defeated Jimmy Anthony, a onetime holder of the Australian welterweight championship, on April 23, 1897, winning a 20-round bout in San Francisco. Barry clearly dominated the 12th through 17th rounds. In the 19th, Barry landed strong counters to the jaw of Anthony, who had received a series of punishing blows to his eyes in several rounds of the fight. Barry dominated the 20th, repeatedly striking Anthony's eyes and jaw, and when the round ended the referee gave the decision to Barry on points. Barry took home $1,500 of the $2,000 purse. Barry countered Anthony's blows frequently with a straight left to the eye, and generally landed nearly twice as many blows when mixing in close quarters, dominating the infighting.

Bantamweight 110 lb title
On December 6, 1897, Barry scored a 20th-round knockout with a crushing right to the jaw against English champion Walter Croot in London, giving him claim to the vacant  World championship.  Barry had taken a lead in the scoring through the 20th round, but Croot had nearly evened the contest by the 19th when Barry landed a series of blows, taking the fight to Croot, continuing until the 20th, when he scored the knockout with a left to the head and a right to the jaw.  Several accounts maintain that Barry was told in the late rounds he would not win the title without a knockout. Croot never regained consciousness and died the following day from a brain injury.  Charged with manslaughter, Barry was exonerated when it was determined that Croot had died from a fractured skull sustained when his head hit the unpadded floor, made of wood.  The unfortunate incident led to reform in the creation of padded canvas ring surfaces.

Barry was distraught over Croot's death. The Chicagoan temporarily considered retirement, but though he returned to boxing when he arrived in the United States, he did not fight with the same ferocity. Barry fought ten times after the Croot tragedy and failed to score a single knockout. On May 30, 1898, Barry fought a 20-round draw against Casper Leon in New York, retaining the World  Bantamweight championship. Leon fought well, but lacked the force to knock out Barry, who remained calm and cautious throughout, but also lacked a knockout punch.

Barry defeated Johnny Ritchie, a well-known bantam, in Chicago on March 26, 1898, in a six-round bout.  New York's The Sun, however, wrote that the match was close and could have been called a draw, describing Barry's performance as "disappointing".  Many in the crowd felt the bout should have been called a draw, but some ringside believed Barry may have had the better of the fifth and sixth rounds.

Steve Flanagan met Barry on June 3, 1898, in a close bout that resulted in a six-round draw in Philadelphia.  Flanagan had claimed the  championship a few months before the fight.  The Scranton's Tribune wrote that Flanagan may have had the better of the bout, clearly dominating the third, and landing the last solid blow in the sixth on Barry's eye.  The Pittsburgh Press also wrote that Flanagan had outpointed Barry.  The newspaper noted that Barry had forced the pace, and fought viciously, but that Flanagan had countered well and done damage at the close of the sixth.

Last 110 lb title match
Barry faced Casper Leon again for the American and World  bantamweight championship in the late evening of December 29, 1898, and retained the title in a 20-round draw. In a close bout, Leon may have thrown a few more blows and shown scientific skills in his defense, but Barry's blows landed with greater precision and were more telling.  The early rounds showed the most intense fighting, and though Barry caught Leon particularly hard in the sixth with a left in the face and a hard blow to the head in the seventh, the fighting was close in most respects.  Barry had already considered retirement and had announced it to a few in the press, though he would take another fight the following year.

In his final bout, he boxed a six-round draw with future bantamweight champion Harry Harris on September 1, 1899.   Ringside observers believed that Harris had won, but that the referee called a draw to allow Barry to retire undefeated.  Chicago's Inter-Ocean wrote that Harris "clearly outpointed Barry and during the last few rounds forced the fighting after a fashion that should have gained him the decision".  The Chicago Tribune wrote that Barry was fortunate to receive a draw as Harris showed considerable skill in avoiding his blows.  Through 1901, Barry fought the occasional exhibition in Chicago, and continued to fight the occasional bout through at least 1910.

Life after boxing

According to Catholic Church records, Barry married Amanda Martha Claussen in Chicago on November 26, 1902.

During World War I, in 1917, Barry worked as a boxing instructor at Camp Gordon, northeast of Atlanta, Georgia.  His duties included physical and bayonet training.  World War I Army boxing training was led by several exceptional featherweight and lightweight champions including Benny Leonard, Packey McFarland and Johnny Kilbane.  Unable to continue as an instructor due to physical limitations, he left the Army in October 1918.

After his war service, Barry worked in Chicago's Cook County clerk's office for 25 years until he left due to poor health.  He occasionally refereed bouts at local clubs, likely for extra income.  He died in a Chicago sanitarium on April 5, 1943, after an illness lasting four years, that according to one source may have been tuberculosis.  After services at Immaculate Conception Church, he was buried in Calvary Cemetery, a Catholic cemetery in the Chicago suburb of Evanston.

According to the International Boxing Hall of Fame, which inducted the diminutive pugilist in the Old Timer category in 2000, Barry was undefeated in 70 professional fights. He won 59 bouts, 39 by knockout, and had nine draws and two no-contests. He is one of just 15 world boxing champions to retire without a loss.

Professional boxing record
All information in this section is derived from BoxRec, unless otherwise stated.

Official Record

All newspaper decisions are officially regarded as “no decision” bouts and are not counted in the win/loss/draw column.

Unofficial record

Record with the inclusion of newspaper decisions in the win/loss/draw column.

See also
Lineal championship

References

External links 
 
 Jimmy Barry - The Cyber Boxing Zone Encyclopedia

|-

|-

1870 births
1943 deaths
American male boxers
American people of Irish descent
Bantamweight boxers
Boxers from Chicago
International Boxing Hall of Fame inductees
Undefeated world boxing champions
World bantamweight boxing champions